Etihad Rail DB is a heavy-rail Operations & Maintenance (O&M) service provider in the UAE.  The company was set up in 2013 as a joint venture between Etihad Rail (51%), the developer of the UAE's national railway network and Deutsche Bahn (DB) (49%), Europe's largest railway operator and infrastructure owner. Etihad Rail DB is responsible for the operations and maintenance of Stage One of the UAE's national railway network for Etihad Rail’s primary customer, the Abu Dhabi National Oil Company (ADNOC). Etihad Rail DB concluded an Operations & Maintenance (O&M) Agreement with Etihad Rail in August 2013.

UAE rail network
Stage One is the first phase to build a mixed freight and passenger railway across the country. Stage Two will extend the railway geographically to the other Emirates as well as connect with partner Gulf Cooperation Council (GCC) railway systems in the Sultanate of Oman and the Kingdom of Saudi Arabia.

Current activities
In Stage One of the UAE's national railway network, Etihad Rail DB operates and maintains 264 km of railway route across the Western Region of the Abu Dhabi Emirate and transports granulated sulphur from the sour gas fields of Shah (Al Hosn Gas) and Habshan (GASCO) to the port of Ruwais in the Western Region of Abu Dhabi, where the sulphur product is exported. The spine of the network is the double track line between Liwa and Ruwais in the Western Region of Abu Dhabi. This section is designed to also operate passenger trains in the future.

Etihad Rail DB is now set to provide 'Shadow Operator' services for stage two of the Etihad Rail project. In its 'Shadow Operator' role, Etihad Rail DB will provide consultancy services to Etihad Rail in preparation for stage two. Such services will include reviewing the design of stage two assets, developing Emiratization requirements, drawing up operational procedures and safety management plans and assisting to ensure the project is delivered with the optimum operations cost.

Service delivery
Since officially commencing commercial operations in January 2016, Etihad Rail DB has been responsible for the transport of up to 22,000 tonnes of granulated sulphur every day in trains of up to 110 wagons. Trains are hauled by 4,300 horsepower EMD SD-70 locomotives. In February 2017, Etihad Rail DB announced that it had safely run its 1,000th train for ADNOC. As of 20 January 2017, Etihad Rail DB confirmed that it had transported more than 10 million tonnes of sulphur in over 1 million hours worked with zero lost time injury (LTI) in a relatively short time since inception, which reflects its internal culture.

Safety
As of the first half of 2017, Etihad Rail DB had achieved its highest performance records against all international safety standards with no lost-time injuries. As railways are new to the region, a community safety campaign was undertaken in 2014 to educate the public on safety around rail tracks.

Know-how transfer
DB Rail Academy, the international training provider of DB Engineering&Consulting GmbH, developed training programs for knowledge transfer and vocational training. In May 2016, Etihad Rail and Etihad Rail DB co-signed an MoU with the Abu Dhabi Vocational Education & Training Institute (ADVETI) related to occupational training. Under the terms of this MoU, the stakeholders operate occupational training and share knowledge for Emirati students seeking qualifications in the UAE's rail industry, in line with the goals of the country's Emiratization policy.  Moreover, Etihad Rail DB has also established a human resources excellence programme which is enabling UAE nationals to gain on-the-job experience.

Stage One – facts

Network (UAE Stage 1 National Railway Network) 

	Length: 264 km

Specifications
 	Double track main line
	Designed for mixed-use traffic
	Equipped with “state of the art” in-cab European signaling system (ETCS level 2)
	Standard gauge
	32.5 tonne maximum axle load
	Built to accommodates double stack containers, e.g. in future from Jebel Ali
	Etihad Rail DB is the world's first rail operator, let alone a heavy-freight operator, to deploy European Train Control System (ETCS_ Level 2 network-wide. ECTS Level 2 
	The railway's tracks are fenced off to allow trains to travel safely around the network. People can conveniently cross at 20 over-bridges, two under-bridges, 10 road underpasses and 18 smaller underpasses for future use. Animals will also be able to move around their environment via the 10 camel underpasses, 22 gazelle underpasses, and 78 reptile underpasses 

Locomotives
	Seven SD70ACS locomotives
	Model: CLASS SD70, built by Electro-Motive Diesel (EMD)
	Energy: Diesel traction, powered by a 4300-horsepower engine
	Speed: 	up to120 km/h
	Weight & Length: Each locomotive nominal weight is 190 metric tonnes and is 22.6 metres long
	Each train can comprise up to 110 wagons, making the overall length of the train around 1.8 km

Wagons 

	240 covered hopper wagons
	Supplier: China Railway Rolling Stock Corporation (CRRC, formerly CSR)
	Features: electro-pneumatic brakes, derailment detection systems and a hot-box detection system that will warn of axle overheating, which could cause fires. CSR claimed its cars are the most technologically advanced railway freight wagons in the world 
Yellow Plant 
       In 2011, Etihad Rail invited manufacturers and/or their local or international representatives to apply for prequalification to be shortlisted for tendering, on a competitive basis, for the supply of railway maintenance equipment. The equipment includes the following items: high-speed tamper, high-speed ballast distribution (plow), high-speed ballast distribution system (broom), ballast conveyor car, on-track sand remover, production switch tamper, ballast regulator, speed swing, sleeper crane, sleeper insert /remover, flash butt welder, road/rail vacuum truck, shunting locomotive, bottom dump ballast wagon, side dump wagon, maintenance of way equipment flat wagon and maintenance of way scorpion wagon.

References

Deutsche Bahn
Railway companies of the United Arab Emirates
Railway companies established in 2013
Emirati companies established in 2013